Antonio Alessandrini (30 July 1786, Bologna – 6 April 1861 in the same city).

Antonio Alessandrini taught comparative anatomy and veterinary science at the University of Bologna. He was president of the Accademia delle Scienze of the city and of the  Zoology Division of the Ottava Riunione degli Italiani Scienziati in Genoa (1846).

He published numerous articles in zoology and parasitology and was particularly interested in the physiology of the silkworm.

Works
(1838) Observazioni antomiche intorno a diverse specie di entozoarii de genere Filaria. Nuovi Annali delle Science Naturali 1:1-17.
Other works see Wikipedia Italy

1786 births
1861 deaths
Italian zoologists
Italian entomologists
Italian veterinarians
19th-century Italian physicians
Physicians from Bologna
Academic staff of the University of Bologna